is a Japanese radio program hosted by voice actors Hiroshi Kamiya and Daisuke Ono. Dear Girl: Stories is broadcast via Nippon Cultural Broadcasting since 2007. The program later appeared on Radio Osaka and  beginning in 2008.

The popularity of Dear Girl: Stories has led to two manga adaptations, several audio drama CDs, a video game, and three films. In addition, for their 2014 film, Kamiya and Ono formed their own house band, Masochistic Ono Band, who later performed theme songs for the program.

Discography

Kamiya and Ono released several music CDs throughout the run of Dear Girl: Stories, which were used as the opening and ending theme songs for Dear Girl: Stories. A total of two studio albums, one extended play, and ten singles were produced.

Kamiya and Ono also sold several CDs exclusively at events. "Shiny × Shiny" was sold at Dear Girl: Stories Festival Carnival Matsuri, which took place on September 19, 2013. "Ten-der Land" was sold at Dear Girl: Stories 10th Anniversary Expo 2016, which took place from June 25–26, 2016. "Taisetsu no Kagi" was sold at DGS VS MOB Live Survive, which took place in April 2018.

Studio albums

Extended plays

Singles

Other songs

Media

Manga

Two manga adaptations based on Dear Girl: Stories were serialized in the monthly magazine Sylph. The first adaptation was illustrated by Saya Iwasaki and titled , which was serialized from March 23, 2009 to February 22, 2012. Both adaptations were released with 4 bound volumes each by ASCII Media Works under the Sylph Comics imprint.

Dear Girl Stories: Hibiki

Dear Girl: Stories Hizuki

Drama CDs

Several audio dramas based on the manga adaptations were released onto CD. Dear Girl: Stories Hibiki released three CDs total: the first CD was released on December 24, 2008 and peaked at #62 on the Oricon Weekly Albums Chart; the second CD was released on October 22, 2010; and the final CD was released on October 20, 2012. Dear Girl: Stories Hizuki had one audio drama CD, which was released on April 10, 2014.

In addition, several audio drama CDs were included as bonuses in several issues of Sylph, the magazine where both manga adaptations were serialized.

Video game

During the serialization of Dear Girl: Stories Hibiki, a visual novel dating sim game titled Dear Girl: Stories Hibiki: Hibiki Tokkun Daisakusen! for the Nintendo DS was released on December 17, 2009 in premium and regular editions. The game was published by ASCII Media Works and Saya Iwasaki, who illustrated the manga, provided the game's artwork.

Films

Three film adaptations based on Dear Girl: Stories were produced, with Kamiya and Ono portraying fictional versions of themselves. The first film, titled Dear Girl: Stories The Movie, was released in 2010 in three theaters in Tokyo, Nagoya, and Osaka but later screened in 26 theaters nationwide.

The second film, titled Dear Girl: Stories The Movie 2: Ace of Asia, was released on February 15, 2014. It was filmed in Hong Kong. It was released on DVD and Blu-ray on October 30, 2014.

The third film, titled Dear Girl: Stories The Movie 3: The United Kingdom of Kochi, was screened in two parts. The first part, titled , was screened in November 2017. The second part, titled , was screened in January 2018. Both parts were bundled in a blu-ray and DVD set that was released on December 6, 2018.

Awards

References

External links
 

Japanese talk radio programs